The Hitchin by-election of 1933 was held on 8 June 1933 after the incumbent Conservative MP, Antony Bulwer-Lytton died in a plane accident.  It was won by the Conservative candidate Arnold Wilson.

References

By-elections to the Parliament of the United Kingdom in Hertfordshire constituencies
1933 elections in the United Kingdom
1933 in England
20th century in Hertfordshire
Hitchin